Qīngtuán (青糰) or Tsingtuan is a form of dumpling that is green, originating from Jiangnan but common throughout China. It is made of glutinous rice mixed with Chinese mugwort or barley grass. This is then usually filled with sweet red or black bean paste. The exact technique for making qingtuan is quite complicated and the grass involved is only edible in the early spring, so it is typically only available around the time of the Qingming Festival , with which the dumpling has become associated. Nowadays, Qīngtuán sold in most convenience stores in China are made of glutinous rice mixed with matcha. It also has more diverse fillings, such as rousong or salted egg yolk.

Much of the qingtuan consumed in China is prepared and consumed as street food from local vendors.

Origin 
The tradition of eating qingtuan at Qingming Festival evolved from the ancient Chinese Cold Food Day (one or two days before Qingming Festival). The custom on Cold Food Day is that people do not make a fire and stop cooking. People can only eat food that doesn't need to be heated. Therefore, food such as Qingtuan can be prepared a day in advance and can satisfy hunger. Later, the Cold Food Festival evolved into the Qingming festival, and qingtuan eaten on the Cold Food Festival became an essential food for the Qingming Festival in eastern and southern China.

Ingredients 
The main ingredients of traditional Qingtuan are glutinous rice flour, Chinese mugwort or barley grass, and red or black bean paste. The general steps for making Qingtuan are: The mugwort is first crushed and squeezed out to make the green juice. Then, mix the green juice with the glutinous rice flour when it is still hot and knead it into a dough. Divide the dough and bean paste into equal amounts of small balls. Then put the bean paste and a nip of lard oil into the flour ball, roll it into a round ball, and put it into the steamer, then it is ready to be served.

See also
 Kusa mochi, the Japanese form of this dish, flavored with Jersey cudweed
 Chhau-a-koe, the Fujianese form of this dish, flavored with Jersey cudweed

References

Chinese cuisine